Barnsley Metropolitan Borough Council is the local authority for the Metropolitan Borough of Barnsley in South Yorkshire, England. One third of the council is elected each year, except for every fourth year when there is no election. Since the last boundary changes on 3 June 2004, councillors are elected from 21 wards.

Political control
From 1913 to 1974 Barnsley was a county borough, independent of any county council. Under the Local Government Act 1972 it had its territory enlarged and became a metropolitan borough, with South Yorkshire County Council providing county-level services. The first election to the reconstituted borough council was held in 1973, initially operating as a shadow authority before coming into its revised powers on 1 April 1974. South Yorkshire County Council was abolished in 1986 and Barnsley became a unitary authority. Political control of the council since 1973 has been held by the following parties:

Leadership
The leaders of the council since 1973 have been:

Council elections
Summary of the council composition after council elections, click on the year for full details of each election. Boundary changes took place for the 1979 election (increasing the number of seats by 6) and more recently the 2004 election (which decreased the number of seats by 3) prompting the whole council to be elected in those years.

Composition since 1973

Borough result maps

By-election results

References

External links
Barnsley Metropolitan Borough Council
By-election results 

 
Politics of Barnsley
Politics of Penistone
Council elections in South Yorkshire
Elections in Barnsley
Barnsley